Elon is an unincorporated community in Allamakee County, Iowa, United States.

History
 A post office was opened in Elon in 1850, and remained in operation until being discontinued in 1907. Elon's population was 17 in 1902, and 18 in 1925.

References

Unincorporated communities in Allamakee County, Iowa
1850 establishments in Iowa
Populated places established in 1850
Unincorporated communities in Iowa